Cladorchiidae is a family of trematodes belonging to the order Plagiorchiida.

Genera

Genera:
 Allassostoma Stunkard, 1916
 Allassostomoides Stunkard, 1924
 Alphamphistoma Thatcher & Jégu, 1996

References

Plagiorchiida